Salanpur is a village, in the Salanpur CD block in the Asansol Sadar subdivision of the Paschim Bardhaman district in the state of West Bengal, India.

Geography

Urbanisation
As per the 2011 census, 83.33% of the population of Asansol Sadar subdivision was urban and 16.67% was rural. In 2015, the municipal areas of Kulti, Raniganj and Jamuria were included within the jurisdiction of Asansol Municipal Corporation. Asansol Sadar subdivision has 26 (+1 partly) Census Towns.(partly presented in the map alongside; all places marked on the map are linked in the full-screen map).

Civic administration

Police station
Salanpur police station has jurisdiction over a part of Salanpur CD block. The area covered is 52.09 km2 and the population covered is 119,142.

Demographics
According to the 2011 Census of India Salanpur had a total population of 4,739 of which 2,454 (52%) were males and 2,285 (48%) were females. Population in the age range 0-6 years was 658. The total number of literate persons in Salanpur was 2,909 (71.28% of the population over 6 years).

*For language details see Salanpur (community development block)#Language and religion

Economy

Coal mining
As per ECL website telephone numbers, operational collieries in the Salanpur Area of Eastern Coalfields in 2018 are: Bonjemehari Colliery, Barmondia Colliery, Dabor Colliery, Gourandi Colliery, Gourandi Begunia Colliery and Mohonpur OCP.

Industry
Bhushan Steel signed an agreement with the West Bengal government to set up a 2 million tonne steel plant, with auxiliary facilities, at Salanpur, in 2007. The company expected to get around 2,500 acres of land acquired in the subsequent one year and start production in 2012. With growing resistance to land acquisition the state government was not able to make much headway. In 2012, Bhusan Steel put the project on hold.

Transport
There is a station at Salanpur on the Asansol-Patna section of the Howrah-Delhi main line.

State Highway 5 running from Rupnarayanpur (in Paschim Bardhaman district) to Junput (in Purba Medinipur district) passes through Salanpur. It links to the Kolkata-Delhi NH 19, passing nearby.

Education
Gyan Bikash Vidyapith is a Bengali-medium coeducational institution established in 1994. It has facilities for teaching from class I to class VIII.

Kalyanesari High School is a Bengali-medium coeducational institution established in 1968. It has facilities for teaching from class V to class X.

Healthcare
The 50-bed Salanpur Hospital of Eastern Coalfields is located at Dendua.

Medical facilities (dispensaries) in the Salanpur Area of ECL are available at Salanpur Area (PO Lalganj), Mohanpur Colliery (PO Lalganj), Burmundia Colliery (PO Kanyapur), Gourandi Colliery (PO Panuria), Dabar Colliery (PO Samdi), Banjamehari Colliery (PO Salanpur), RH Dendua (PO Salanpur).

References

Villages in Paschim Bardhaman district